The 1931 Howard Bulldogs football team was an American football team that represented Howard College (now known as the Samford University) as a member of the Dixie Conference and the Southern Intercollegiate Athletic Association (SIAA) during the 1931 college football season. In their third year under head coach Eddie McLane, the team compiled a 8–2–2.

Schedule

References

Howard
Howard
Samford Bulldogs football seasons
Howard Bulldogs football